Penicillium calidicanium is a fungus species of the genus of Penicillium which was isolated from soil in Taiwan.

See also
List of Penicillium species

References 

calidicanium
Fungi described in 2002